Nicholas David Speegle (born November 29, 1981) is a former American football player. He played professionally an outside linebacker in the National Football League (NFL) with the Cleveland Browns from 2005 to 2006. Speegle played college football at the University of New Mexico.

High school career
Speegle attended La Cueva High School in Albuquerque, New Mexico and was a good student and a letterman in both football and track and field. As a senior, he was a first-team All-State defensive end and a second-team state tight end in football. In track and field, he won state and set school records in the 110-meter hurdles.

College career
Speegle was a four-year starter at outside linebacker.  He was a consistent defensive force after working his way into the starting lineup as a redshirt freshman. He was the 2004 team captain...never flashy but was a quiet playmaker throughout his career and the veteran leader of the Lobo defense in 2004.  He was an incredibly tough player who never missed a game, battling through a number of painful injuries over the years.  Fellow New Mexico linebackers described him as an old-school, classic type of LB in the mold of NFL Hall of Famers Ray Nitchke, Jack Lambert and Dick Butkus.  Speegle was two-time Honorable-Mention All MWC selection before breaking through with Frist Team Honors his final season.  He was named Third-team Freshman All-American by The Sporting News in 2001.  He finished his career ranked No. 14 at UNM with 317 career tackles for loss and made 43 starts (including 42 straight to close his career).  He was the total package of size, speed, strength, and attitude.  He had good instincts and was an incredibly sure tackler.  He added over 30 pounds after entering New Mexico at 207.  He graduated in May 2004, with a degree in General Management and a 3.97 cumulative GPA. He played his senior year as a graduate student, pursuing his Master's Degree in Sports Administration.  He was a two-time First-team Academic All-District selection, two-time MWC Scholar-Athlete Award winner, an Academic All-MWC Honoree all four years, and was awarded for his community service by being named to the 2004 American Football Coaches Association National Good Works Team. (clevelandbrowns.com, 2005)

NFL career

NFL Combine
 Height: 6 feet, 6 inches
 Weight: 242 pounds
 Bench press: 390 pounds
 Squat: 465 pounds

Cleveland Browns
Speegle was drafted by the Cleveland Browns in the sixth round of the 2005 NFL Draft as the 176th pick overall. He played two seasons as a linebacker and on special teams with the Browns and San Diego Chargers before suffering a career ending back injury.

References

External links
 New Mexico profile
 
 Pro Football Archives profile

Living people
1981 births
American football linebackers
Cleveland Browns players
New Mexico Lobos football players
Players of American football from Albuquerque, New Mexico